Petalocheirus is a genus of assassin bugs in the subfamily Salyavatinae. Species in the genus have a leaf-like broadening of the foretibia, and many species are known to be predators of termites. The genus is distributed in the tropics of Africa and Asia and species in apparently closely related genera such as Platychira may need further examination.

Species in the genus include:
 Petalocheirus bergrothi 
 Petalocheirus brachialis 
 Petalocheirus burmanus 
 Petalocheirus gazella 
 Petalocheirus indicus 
 Petalocheirus inimicus 
 Petalocheirus malayus 
 Petalocheirus perakensis 
 Petalocheirus pugil 
 Petalocheirus rapinator 
 Petalocheirus rubiginosus 
 Petalocheirus schoutedeni 
 Petalocheirus schroederi 
 Petalocheirus sedulus 
 Petalocheirus variegatus 
 Petalocheirus villiersi 
 Petalocheirus vittiventris {{small|Bergroth, 1903

References 

Heteroptera genera
Reduviidae